Barrhaven is a suburb of Ottawa, Ontario, Canada. Prior to amalgamation with Ottawa in 2001, Barrhaven was part of the City of Nepean. Its population as of the Canada 2021 Census was 103,234.

Geography
Barrhaven is approximately bounded to the north by the Greenbelt, to the east by the Rideau River, to the west by Highway 416, and to the south by the new Half Moon Bay development along Cambrian Road south of the Jock River. The area is diagonally bisected by CN rail tracks. Barrhaven is surrounded by rural areas and farmland, with the exception of the growing Riverside South area across the Rideau River. Directly south of Barrhaven is Manotick, a commuter town of the city.

Barrhaven is divided into several areas: Barrhaven proper or Old Barrhaven is the westernmost part of the neighbourhood, lying between Cedarview Road and Greenbank Road. New residential development is expanding the west side of Old Barrhaven between Cedarview and Strandherd Drive. Also included in this area is a triangle of land east of Greenbank between Fallowfield Road and the railway tracks known as Knollsbrook or The Triangle. South of this is the area known as Longfields, which stretches south to Strandherd and east to Woodroffe Avenue. Sandwiched between the railway tracks, Jockvale Road, Greenbank and Strandherd is the neighbourhood of Barrhaven on the Green. East of Woodroffe, next to the Rideau River, is the neighbourhood of Davidson Heights. South of Strandherd and east of Greenbank is a new community known as Chapman Mills. As Prince of Wales Drive approaches Jockvale, there is a thriving community known as Stonebridge that is located beside the Stonebridge Golf & Country Club.

History

The Barrhaven area was long inhabited by First Nations peoples, and the modern Jockvale Road follows an ancient path that was originally a trail through the wilderness. In the 19th century the area became populated by European farmers as the area was divided into a number of rural homesteads.

The old Barrhaven School House located at Jockvale and Strandherd was in built in 1906. Today, the school stands as a historic site.  In 1911, the Canadian Northern Railway built a rail line from Ottawa to Toronto through the area. Fast passenger service was offered for many years from Fallowfield Station (near the intersection of Strandherd Dr and Cedarview Rd) to Ottawa and beyond After many years of absence, passenger rail service was reintroduced to the area by Via Rail in the fall of 2002 through a new Fallowfield Station located at the intersection of Fallowfield Road and Woodroffe Avenue.

Modern Barrhaven was established in the 1960s, one of a group of new suburbs built outside the Greenbelt from the main city of Ottawa. Building in the area was begun by Mel Barr, for whom the community is named. Barr had originally purchased a  farm with the intent of constructing a horse racing track. However the Rideau Carleton Raceway was built further to the east, and Barr instead decided to develop his land for housing. In 1968-69 Barrhaven Public School was built as the very first public school in Barrhaven.

Barrhaven was incorporated into the City of Nepean in 1978 and subsequently grew rapidly into a community of several tens of thousands of people. Commercial centres were slower to arrive. In 1990 the area was served by a single grocery store, had no movie theatre, and not even a bar. This has changed with the opening in 1991 of the vast Barrhaven Town Centre complex of big box stores and smaller commercial establishments, as well as a few smaller shopping malls. The 1990s also saw the influx of high-tech companies into the area (such as JDS Uniphase and Nortel), and the growth of the Public Service in the National Capital Region. The area got its first high school in 1998 when Mother Teresa High School (Catholic) opened, followed by John McCrae Secondary School (public) in 1999. Barrhaven gained its third high school in 2002 when St. Joseph High School (Catholic) opened. In September 2009, Longfields-Davidson Heights Secondary School (Public) opened.  In 2011 École secondaire catholique Pierre-Savard opened.

Character

Like most North American suburbs built so quickly and so recently Barrhaven has a very uniform feel, especially considering how big it is. Almost every street consists of town houses with some streets having comparatively large suburban houses. In the older parts of Barrhaven, the streets are curvilinear, never forming a grid as they do in older parts of Ottawa. The area is very suburban and tends to attract families.

Neighbourhoods
Barrhaven is divided into many neighbourhoods. The names are generally selected by developers.
 Strandherd Meadows, the infill development extending Old Barrhaven to Strandherd Drive
 Longfields, east of Greenbank Road, west of Woodroffe Avenue, south of Fallowfield Road and north of Strandherd Drive
 Davidson Heights, east of Woodroffe Avenue
 Havenlea, bounded by Crestway Drive, Leikin Drive, Prince of Wales and Cresthaven Drive
 Chapman Mills, bounded by Prince of Wales Dr to the south/east, Woodroffe Ave to the west, and Stoneway Dr to the north.
 Rideau Glen, along Prince of Wales Dr, Holborn Avenue, and Rideau Glen Drive, north of Winding Way
 Winding Way, east of Prince of Wales Drive
 Stonebridge, located between Jockvale Rd and Prince of Wales
 Half Moon Bay, new neighbourhood under development along Cambrian Road, west of Greenbank, east of Highway 416, south of the Jock River and north of Barnsdale Road
 Quinn's Pointe, new community under development along Cambrian Road, west of Greenbank, north of Barnsdale Road
 Barrhaven Mews, new community under construction between Strandherd Road and the Jock River and west of Jockvale/Greenbank Roads
 Barrhaven On The Green, located between Jockvale Road, Greenbank Road, Strandherd Road, and the Rail tracks
 Havenlea, east of Woodroffe Avenue, south of Crestway Drive
 Heart's Desire, located along the Jock River, in between Jockvale Road and Woodroffe Ave.
 West Pointe Village, located between Cedarview Rd., Fallowfield Rd., Strandherd Rd., and the Rail tracks
Pheasant Run, west of Larkin Drive, south of Fallowfield, north of Jockvale and east of Cedarview Road
Fraservale, south and west of Jockvale, east of Cedarview and north of rail tracks
Knollsbrook, west and north of rail tracks, south of Fallowfield and east of Greenbank.
Havencourt, across from South Nepean Park, east of Greenbank between the transitway and Longfields Drive.
Havencrest, East of the intersection of Strandherd and Fallowfield and North of Jockvale Road.

Features and amenities
Barrhaven contains several public and Catholic schools and numerous parks and playgrounds, mainly built in since 2000. It is also home to the Walter Baker Sports Centre which contains a library and other facilities. The main commercial district surrounds the intersection of Strandherd Drive and Greenbank Road, with a seven-screen cinema, Loblaws,  Wal-Mart, Indigo Books and Music, Staples, Winners, Homesense, Sobeys, Sport Chek, Starbucks, Your Independent Grocer, and Best Buy, among others. The Minto Recreation Complex, a new multi-use community centre at the corner of Cambrian and Greenbank, opened in 2014. A major employment district was established in 2015 in the area west of Strandherd Drive adjacent to Highway 416, known as the CitiGate corporate campus. A Costco store has opened in fall of 2016, including several other retail establishments.

Transportation
Barrhaven is served by seven local bus routes: 80, 170, 171, 173, 175, and 176 . These routes serve the local streets of Barrhaven as well as serving several stations on the Transitway network where a transfer can be made to Ottawa's Rapid Transit system with Route 75, 74 and 99. There are five express bus routes, 270, 271, 272, 273 and 277, that provide direct service to downtown Ottawa during the morning rush hour and from downtown during the afternoon rush hour; travel time is approximately 30 minutes. Previously, these routes were numbered 70, 71, 72 (previously 76), 73 and 77, but were changed in 2017 as part the 2018 On Track LRT project. Route 176 runs from the Fallowfield Station to Manotick, stopping in the growing Stonebridge community before travelling on the lower half of Jockvale before connecting with Prince of Wales Drive.

Intercity Via Rail connections can be made at Fallowfield railway station to Montreal and Toronto.

Until 2006, it had been planned that the north-south light-rail O-Train (today's Trillium Line) would be extended to the centre of Barrhaven near Riocan Marketplace via Riverside South. The project was cancelled on December 14, 2006, by Ottawa City Council, which decided to focus on building rail-based rapid transit lines in the inner city instead. Rail-based rapid transit to Barrhaven is not expected to be introduced until after 2031, when the three lines in the inner city are expected to be completed.

On January 2, 2007, OC Transpo opened the Strandherd Transitway Station and Park & Ride lot in Barrhaven. Directly across from the Riocan/Barrhaven Shopping Centre's Wal-Mart & TD Bank, the facility has parking space for about 330 cars. It was built to help with overcrowding at the Fallowfield Station and meet the increased demand for park and ride spaces in the community. Rapid transit route 75 takes approximately 10 minutes to travel between Fallowfield Station and Strandherd Station, and 2 minutes between Strandherd Station and Barrhaven Centre Station. The Province of Ontario funded one-third of the $5 million cost.

In April 2011, the transitway (BRT) network was expanded in Barrhaven. One feature was the extension of Route 94 (now Route 74) to the intersection of Woodroffe and Strandherd. A new stretch of BRT was also constructed between Fallowfield and Strandherd to reduce travel times on Route 95 (Route 75 since 2019). 
In September 2014, a new BRT route was established on Chapman Mills Drive, using a graveyard median from the canceled south-western LRT route. Route 99 starts at Barrhaven Centre and using new Beatrice Station proceeds to Greenboro Station, the O-Train Line 2 terminus, at non-peak hours, via Riverside South (Vimy Memorial Bridge) and Leitrim Station. At peak hours, the 99 goes all the way to Hurdman Station via the Southeast Transitway, connecting to the O-Train Line 1.

Education

Photos

Notes

References
Melanie O'Brien. "Thriving beyond the greenbelt: Barrhaven growing rapidly as buyers look for a sense of community." The Ottawa Citizen. Jun 29, 1996.  p. J.1
Janet Collins. "The Far Haven: Barrhaven" The Ottawa Citizen. Feb 1, 1993. p. B.3
Carrie Buchanan. "A sleeping suburb; Barrhaven's nothing but a bedroom community." The Ottawa Citizen. Oct 29, 1989. p. D.1

Neighbourhoods in Ottawa